Events from the year 1974 in art.

Events
26 April – Nineteen Old Master paintings from the Beit collection are stolen from Russborough House in Ireland by a Provisional Irish Republican Army gang including English heiress Rose Dugdale.
 Roy Strong becomes Director of the Victoria and Albert Museum.
 Hallwalls, a non profit exhibition space and arts organization, is established in a converted ice packing warehouse in Buffalo, New York, by the artists Charles Clough, Robert Longo, Diane Bertolo, Nancy Dwyer, Larry Lundy, Cindy Sherman and Michael Zwack.

Awards
 Archibald Prize: Sam Fullbrook – Jockey Norman Stephens
 John Moores Painting Prize - Myles Murphy - "Figure with Yellow Foreground"

Exhibitions

Works

 Bruce Beasley – Big Red (sculpture, Eugene, Oregon)
 Salvador Dalí – Nieuw Amsterdam (object/sculpture)
 Judy Dater – Imogen and Twinka at Yosemite (photograph)
 Silvio Gazzaniga – FIFA World Cup Trophy
 David Hockney – Contre-jour in the French style – Against the Day dans le style français
 Nabil Kanso – Vietnam
 Bernard Kirschenbaum – Twist for Max (sculpture)
 Joan Miró
 Hands flying off toward the constellations
 The hope of a condemned Man (series)
 Odd Nerdrum – Liberation
 Enzo Plazzotta – Crucifixion
 Tony Rosenthal – 5 in 1 (steel sculpture, New York City)
 Ruskin Spear – Harold Wilson
 Graham Sutherland – Lord Goodman
 David Wynne – Boy With a Dolphin (bronze, Cheyne Walk, London)
 Meet the Residents (album cover)

Films
A Bigger Splash

Births
15 May – Kadir Nelson, African American illustrator.
31 May – Adrian Tomine, American cartoonist.
16 June – Paul Lee, English artist.
1 September – Jhonen Vasquez, American comic book artist, cartoonist and writer.
8 November – Masashi Kishimoto, Japanese mangaka.
13 November – Kerim Seiler, Swiss artist and architect.
7 December – Kang Full, South Korean webcomic artist.

Full date unknown
 Banksy, English graffiti artist.
 Bogna Burska, Polish playwright and visual artist.
 Amelie Chabannes, French painter and sculptor.
 Luke Jerram, British installation artist.
 Fabrice Lachant, French photographer.
 OSGEMEOS (Otavio and Gustavo Pandolfo), Brazilian twin graffiti artists.
 Dulce Pinzon, Mexican-born visual artist.
 Bojan Šarčević, Bosnian-French visual artist.
 Bedwyr Williams, Welsh installation and performance artist.

Deaths

January to June
19 January – Edward Seago, English painter (b. 1910).
30 January – Robert Darwin, English painter and Rector of the Royal College of Art (b. 1910)
15 February – Petar Lubarda, Serbian painter (b. 1907).
4 March – Adolph Gottlieb, American abstract expressionist painter and sculptor (b. 1903).
9 March – Daniel O'Neill, Irish painter (b. 1920).
5 April – A. Y. Jackson, Canadian painter (b. 1882).
31 May – Juan Bautista Garcia, Puerto Rican painter (b. 1904).
7 June 
Émilie Charmy, French artist (b. 1878)
Milton Menasco, American painter and art director (b. 1890).
22 June – Alain Saint-Ogan, French comics author and artist (b. 1895).
30 June – Frank McKelvey, Irish painter (b. 1895).

July to December
9 July – Georges Ribemont-Dessaignes, French writer and artist (b. 1884).
8 August – Charles Wheeler, English sculptor (b. 1892).
11 August – Jan Tschichold, German typographer, book designer, teacher and writer (b. 1902).
 August – André Edouard Marty, French artist (b. 1882).
8 September – James Swinnerton, American cartoonist and artist (b. 1875).
17 September – André Dunoyer de Segonzac, French painter and graphic artist (b. 1884).
28 October – David Jones, English poet and painter (b. 1895).
20 December – Risto Stijović, Serbian sculptor (b. 1894).
21 December – James Henry Govier, English painter (b. 1910).
25 December – Harry Kernoff, Irish painter (b. 1900).

See also
 1974 in Fine Arts of the Soviet Union

References

 
Years of the 20th century in art
1970s in art